Thorleif Tharaldsen (15 December 1893 – 6 April 1979) was a Norwegian footballer. He played in one match for the Norway national football team in 1915.

References

External links
 

1893 births
1979 deaths
Norwegian footballers
Norway international footballers
Place of birth missing
Association footballers not categorized by position